Lauzadus or Lauzadeai was a town of ancient Cilicia or of Isauria, inhabited in Byzantine times. It became a bishopric; no longer the seat of a residential bishop, it remains a titular see of the Roman Catholic Church.

Its site is located near Beşyayla, Asiatic Turkey.

References

Populated places in ancient Cilicia
Populated places in ancient Isauria
Catholic titular sees in Asia
Former populated places in Turkey
Populated places of the Byzantine Empire
History of Karaman Province